Hacıosman is an underground rapid transit station and northern terminus of the M2 line of the Istanbul Metro. It is located in southern Sarıyer under Tarabya Bayırı Avenue. Hacıosman was opened on 29 April 2011 as a northern extension of the M2 to service neighborhoods in Sarıyer. It has an island platform serviced by two tracks.

Layout

References

Sarıyer
Istanbul metro stations
Railway stations opened in 2011
2011 establishments in Turkey